Doto cabecar is a species of sea slug, a nudibranch, a marine gastropod mollusc in the family Dotidae.

Distribution
This species was described from the Caribbean coast of Costa Rica. It has subsequently been reported from the Virgin Islands and Puerto Rico.

Description
This nudibranch is pale brown with yellow rhinophores and cerata. The ceratal tubercles bear dark spots, except for the terminal tubercle on each ceras, which has a concentration of internal white glands. Further details of this species are given in Ortea & Caballer, 2003.

The maximum recorded body length is 14 mm.

Ecology
Minimum recorded depth is 20 m. Maximum recorded depth is 20 m.

Doto cabecar feeds on the hydroid, Thyroscyphus marginatus (family Sertulariidae).

References

External links

Dotidae
Gastropods described in 2001